Victoria Upper Glacier is a glacier occupying the upper northwest end of Victoria Valley in Antarctica. It is a retreating glacier. The Victoria Valley is the northernmost of the McMurdo Dry Valleys. Melt water from the glacier feeds the Victoria River and on from there to Lake Vida. It was named by the Victoria University Wellington Antarctic Expedition (1958–59) for their Alma Mater, which sponsored the expedition. In 2003, it was renamed from Upper Victoria Glacier to be consistent with Victoria Lower Glacier.

Heaphy Spur divides the head of Victoria Upper Glacier.

References

Glaciers of Victoria Land
McMurdo Dry Valleys